Keith J. Gillespie (born September 18, 1952) is a Republican former member of the Pennsylvania House of Representatives for the 47th District who served from 2003 to 2022.

Career
Prior to entering politics, Gillespie was a paramedic at Memorial Hospital in York, Pennsylvania. Later, he was the director of safety, security and pre-hospital systems at Memorial Hospital. Gillespie was also a president of the York County Republican Club.

Gillespie was first elected in 2002.  He is currently a member of the House Game and Fisheries, Intergovernmental Affairs, Professional Licensure, and Tourism and Recreational Development Committees. He is also chairman of the Subcommittee on Federal/State Relations and Arts and Entertainment.

Committee assignments 

 Game & Fisheries (chair)
 Professional Licensure

Election results
The 47th District from which Gillespie is elected includes residents of Conewago, East Manchester, Hellam, and Manchester Townships in a northeast portion of York County, their surrounded and adjacent boroughs, and three (the northernmost) of Springettsbury Township's eight local districts. Gillespie received 21.5% of the vote in a crowded eight-candidate Republican primary in 2002, which sent him to that year's general election. While Chad Lonergan had won the corresponding Democratic primary, Gillespie faced only independent candidate Marlin Cutshall in the 2002 general election and won with 13,114 votes (92.3%). He had no reelection challengers until 2010 when he beat Democrat Eric Wolfgang 72.8% – 27.2%. Democratic candidate Sarah Speed faced Gillespie in 2012 and he kept his seat with 20,236 votes (60.7%) to her 13,127. Gillespie had no ballot opposition in 2014 and 2016. Democrat Michael Wascovich received 35.6% of the vote in 2018 to Gillespie's 64.4%. In 2020, he won against Democrat Fred Owens, 65.4% to 34.6%.

In 2022, Gillespie lost in the Republican primary to challenger Joe D'Orsie, 40% to 59%.

Personal
Representative Gillespie graduated from Solanco High School in 1970. He attended Keystone Junior College and Franklin and Marshall College, studying biology and business administration.

Gillespie and his wife, a registered nurse at Memorial Hospital, have three children.

References

External links
Representative Gillespie's official web site
PA House profile

1952 births
21st-century American politicians
Franklin & Marshall College alumni
Living people
People from Wilmington, Delaware
Politicians from York, Pennsylvania
Republican Party members of the Pennsylvania House of Representatives